Saint-Esprit may refer to:

Saint-Esprit, Martinique, France
Saint-Esprit, Quebec, Canada
Saint-Esprit, Paris, a church
French ship Saint-Esprit, ship of the French Navy